The Civil Rights Act of 1866 (enacted April 9, 1866, reenacted 1870) was the first United States federal law to define citizenship and affirm that all citizens are equally protected by the law. It was mainly intended, in the wake of the American Civil War, to protect the civil rights of persons of African descent born in or brought to the United States.

The Act was passed by Congress in 1866 and vetoed by United States President Andrew Johnson. In April 1866, Congress again passed the bill to support the Thirteenth Amendment, and Johnson again vetoed it, but a two-thirds majority in each chamber overrode the veto to allow it to become law without presidential signature.

John Bingham and other congressmen argued that Congress did not yet have sufficient constitutional power to enact this law.  Following passage of the Fourteenth Amendment in 1868, Congress ratified the 1866 Act in 1870.

Primary objectives, introduction and amendment
The act had three primary objectives for the integration of African Americans into the American society following the Civil War: 1.) a definition of American citizenship 2.) the rights which come with this citizenship and 3.) the unlawfulness to deprive any person of citizenship rights "on the basis of race, color, or prior condition of slavery or involuntary servitude." The act accomplished these three primary objectives.

The author of the Civil Rights Act of 1866 was United States Senator Lyman Trumbull. Congressman James F. Wilson summarized what he considered to be the purpose of the act as follows, when he introduced the legislation in the House of Representatives:

During the subsequent legislative process, the following key provision was deleted: "there shall be no discrimination in civil rights or immunities among the inhabitants of any State or Territory of the United States on account of race, color, or previous condition of servitude." John Bingham was an influential supporter of this deletion, on the ground that courts might construe the term "civil rights" more broadly than people like Wilson intended. Weeks later, Senator Trumbull described the bill's intended scope:

On April 5, 1866, the Senate overrode President Andrew Johnson's veto. This marked the first time that the U.S. Congress ever overrode a presidential veto for a major piece of legislation.

Content
With an incipit of "An Act to protect all Persons in the United States in their Civil Rights, and furnish the Means of their vindication", the act declared that all people born in the United States who are not subject to any foreign power are entitled to be citizens, without regard to race, color, or previous condition of slavery or involuntary servitude. A similar provision (called the Citizenship Clause) was written a few months later into the proposed Fourteenth Amendment to the United States Constitution.

The Civil Rights Act of 1866 also said that any citizen has the same right that a white citizen has to make and enforce contracts, sue and be sued, give evidence in court, and inherit, purchase, lease, sell, hold, and convey real and personal property. Additionally, the act guaranteed to all citizens the "full and equal benefit of all laws and proceedings for the security of person and property, as is enjoyed by white citizens, and ... like punishment, pains, and penalties..." Persons who denied these rights on account of race or previous enslavement were guilty of a misdemeanor and upon conviction faced a fine not exceeding $1,000, or imprisonment not exceeding one year, or both.

The act used language very similar to that of the Equal Protection Clause in the newly proposed Fourteenth Amendment. In particular, the act discussed the need to provide "reasonable protection to all persons in their constitutional rights of equality before the law, without distinction of race or color, or previous condition of slavery or involuntary servitude, except as a punishment for crime, whereof the party shall have been duly convicted. ..."

This statute was a major part of general federal policy during  Reconstruction, and was closely related to the Second Freedmen's Bureau Act of 1866. According to Congressman John Bingham, "the seventh and eighth sections of the Freedmen's Bureau bill enumerate the same rights and all the rights and privileges that are enumerated in the first section of this [the Civil Rights] bill."

Parts of the Civil Rights Act of 1866 are enforceable into the 21st century, according to the United States Code:

One section of the United States Code (42 U.S.C. §1981), is §1 of the Civil Rights Act of 1866 as revised and amended by subsequent Acts of Congress. The Civil Rights Act of 1866 was reenacted by the Enforcement Act of 1870, ch. 114, § 18, 16 Stat. 144, codified as sections 1977 and 1978 of the Revised Statutes of 1874, and appears now as 42 U.S.C. §§ 1981–82 (1970).  Section 2 of the Civil Rights Act of 1866, as subsequently revised and amended, appears in the US Code at 18 U.S.C. §242. After the fourteenth amendment became effective, the 1866 Act was reenacted as an addendum to the Enforcement Act of 1870 in order to dispel any possible doubt as to its constitutionality. Act of May 31, 1870, ch. 114, § 18, 16 Stat. 144.

Enactment, constitutionalization, and reenactment

Republicans within Congress were concerned with "an only nominal freedom for the former slaves." The rights of individual citizens should be protected by the Federal government of the United States. Senator Lyman Trumbull was the Senate sponsor of the Civil Rights Act of 1866, and he argued that Congress had power to enact it in order to eliminate a discriminatory "badge of servitude" prohibited by the Thirteenth Amendment. Congressman John Bingham, principal author of the first section of the Fourteenth Amendment, was one of several Republicans who believed (prior to that Amendment) that Congress lacked power to pass the 1866 Act. In the 20th century, the U.S. Supreme Court ultimately adopted Trumbull's Thirteenth Amendment rationale for congressional power to ban racial discrimination by states and by private parties, in view of the fact that the Thirteenth Amendment does not require a state actor.

To the extent that the Civil Rights Act of 1866 may have been intended to go beyond preventing discrimination, by conferring particular rights on all citizens, the constitutional power of Congress to do that was more questionable. For example, Representative William Lawrence argued that Congress had power to enact the statute because of the Privileges and Immunities Clause in Article IV of the original unamended Constitution, even though courts had suggested otherwise.

In any event, there is currently no consensus that the language of the Civil Rights Act of 1866 actually purports to confer any legal benefits upon white citizens. Representative Samuel Shellabarger said that it did not.

After enactment of the Civil Rights Act of 1866 by overriding a presidential veto, some members of Congress supported the Fourteenth Amendment in order to eliminate doubts about the constitutionality of the Civil Rights Act of 1866, or to ensure that no subsequent Congress could later repeal or alter the main provisions of that Act. Thus, the Citizenship Clause in the Fourteenth Amendment parallels citizenship language in the Civil Rights Act of 1866, and likewise the Equal Protection Clause parallels nondiscrimination language in the 1866 Act; the extent to which other clauses in the Fourteenth Amendment may have incorporated elements of the Civil Rights Act of 1866 is a matter of continuing debate.

Ratification of the Fourteenth Amendment was completed in 1868, 2 years after, the 1866 Act was reenacted, as Section 18 of the Enforcement Act of 1870.

Aftermath and consequences
After Johnson's veto was overridden the measure became law. Despite this victory, even some Republicans who had supported the goals of the Civil Rights Act began to doubt that Congress possessed the constitutional power to turn those goals into laws. The experience encouraged both radical and moderate Republicans to seek Constitutional guarantees for black rights, rather than relying on temporary political majorities.

The activities of groups such as the Ku Klux Klan (KKK) undermined the act, meaning that it failed to immediately secure the civil rights of African Americans.

While it has been de jure illegal in the U.S. to discriminate in employment and housing on the basis of race since 1866, federal penalties were not provided for until the second half of the 20th century (with the passage of related civil rights legislation), which meant remedies were left to the individuals involved: because those being discriminated against had limited or no access to legal assistance, this often left many victims of discrimination without recourse.

There have been an increasing number of remedies provided under this act since the second half of the 20th century, including the landmark Jones v. Mayer and Sullivan v. Little Hunting Park, Inc. decisions in 1968.

See also
US labor law

References

Bibliography

Further reading
 Belz, Herman. A New Birth of Freedom: The Republican Party and Freedom Rights, 1861 to 1866 (2000)
 Bracey, Christopher A., and Cody J. Foster. Gale Researcher Guide for: The Civil Rights Act of 1866 (Gale, Cengage Learning, 2018).
 Cahill, Bernadette. No Vote for Women: The Denial of Suffrage in Reconstruction America (McFarland, 2019).
 Dew, Lee Allen. "The Reluctant Radicals of 1866," Midwest Quarterly (Spring 1967) pp 261–276.
 Edwards, Laura F. A Legal History of the Civil War and Reconstruction (Cambridge UP, 2015).
 Foner, Eric. Reconstruction: America's Unfinished Revolution, 1863–1877 (1988)
 Greenfield, Gary A., and Don B. Kates Jr. "Mexican Americans, Racial Discrimination, and the Civil Rights Act of 1866." California Law Review (1975): 662–731 online.
 Hyman, Harold M. A More Perfect Union (1975) pp 427–31 online
 Kaczorowski, Robert J. "The Enforcement Provisions of the Civil Rights Act of 1866: A Legislative History in Light of Runyon v. McCrary." The Yale Law Journal 98.3 (1989): 565–595.
 Kohl, Robert L. "The Civil Rights Act of 1866, Its Hour Come Round at Last: Jones v. Alfred H. Mayer Co." Virginia Law Review (1969): 272–300. online
 Player, Mack A. Federal Law of Employment Discrimination in a Nutshell (2004)

 Samito, Christian G., ed. The Greatest and the Grandest Act: The Civil Rights Act of 1866 from Reconstruction to Today (Southern Illinois UP, 2018) excerpt.
 Tsesis, Alexander. The Thirteenth Amendment and American Freedom: A Legal History (2004)

Primary sources
 Samito, Christian G., ed. Changes in Law and Society During the Civil War and Reconstruction: A Legal History Documentary Reader (SIU Press, 2009{.

External links
 

1866 in American law
Anti-discrimination law in the United States
History of African-American civil rights
Reconstruction Era legislation
Civil Rights Acts
United States federal criminal legislation
39th United States Congress